The treepies (known also as crypsirinines from the subfamily's name, Crypsirininae) comprise four closely related genera (Dendrocitta, Crypsirina, Temnurus and Platysmurus) of long-tailed passerine birds in the family Corvidae. There are 12 species of treepie. Some treepies are similar to magpies. Most treepies are black, white, gray or brown. They are found in Southeast Asia. They live in tropical forests. They are highly arboreal and rarely come to the ground to feed.

Species
Following Ericson et al. (2005), the black magpies are placed with the treepies:

References
 Ericson, Per G. P.; Jansén, Anna-Lee; Johansson, Ulf S. & Ekman, Jan (2005): Inter-generic relationships of the crows, jays, magpies and allied groups (Aves: Corvidae) based on nucleotide sequence data. Journal of Avian Biology 36: 222–234. PDF fulltext

External links
Treepie videos on the Internet Bird Collection

Corvidae
Magpies and treepies
Bird common names

fr:Dendrocitta